Louis-Guy de Guérapin de Vauréal (3 January 1687, in Brienne-la-Vieille – 10 June 1760) was a French ecclesiastic and diplomat.

He was master of the king's chapel in 1732 and bishop of Rennes (1732–58). A major opponent of the Jansenists, he presided at five assemblies of the clergy of Brittany between 1732 and 1740. He was also entrusted with many embassies, notably to Madrid between 1740 and 1749, and was elected to the Académie française in 1749, though the only writings he has left are some church documents.

References

External links
Académie Française

1687 births
1760 deaths
Ambassadors of France to Spain
Bishops of Rennes
18th-century French diplomats
18th-century French Roman Catholic bishops
Members of the Académie Française